Pseudophasmatidae is a family of stick insect, in the suborder Verophasmatodea, commonly called the "striped walkingsticks". 
An important identifying characteristic is its mesothorax, which is never more than three times as long as the prothorax.

Tribes and genera are as follows:

 Subfamily Pseudophasmatinae Rehn, 1904
 Tribe Anisomorphini Redtenbacher, 1906
 Genus Anisomorpha Gray, 1835
 Genus Atratomorpha Conle & Hennemann, 2002
 Genus Autolyca Stål, 1875
 Genus Columbiophasma Conle & Hennemann, 2002
 Genus Decidia Stål, 1875
 Genus Malacomorpha Rehn, 1906
 Genus Monticomorpha Conle & Hennemann, 2002
 Genus Ornatomorpha Conle, Hennemann & Gutiérrez, 2011
 Genus Peruphasma Conle & Hennemann, 2002
 Genus Pteranisomorpha Zompro, 2004
 Genus Urucumania Zompro, 2004
 Tribe Pseudophasmatini Kirby, 1904
 Genus Ignacia Rehn, 1904
 Genus Paranisomorpha Redtenbacher, 1906
 Genus Pseudophasma Kirby, 1896
 Genus Tithonophasma Zompro, 2004
 Genus Nanhuaphasma Chen, He & Li, 2002
 Subfamily Stratocleinae Günther, 1953
 Tribe Stratocleini Günther, 1953
 Genus Agrostia Redtenbacher, 1906
 Genus Anisa Redtenbacher, 1906
 Genus Antherice Redtenbacher, 1906
 Genus Anthericonia Zompro, 2004
 Genus Brizoides Redtenbacher, 1906
 Genus Cesaphasma Koçak & Kemal, 2010
 Genus Chlorophasma Redtenbacher, 1906
 Genus Eucles Redtenbacher, 1906
 Genus Euphasma Redtenbacher, 1906
 Genus Holca Redtenbacher, 1906
 Genus Olcyphides Griffini, 1899
 Genus Paraphasma Redtenbacher, 1906
 Genus Parastratocles Redtenbacher, 1906
 Genus Stratocles Stål, 1875
 Genus Tenerella Redtenbacher, 1906
 Subfamily Xerosomatinae Bradley & Galil, 1977
 Tribe Prexaspini Zompro, 2004
 Genus Isagoras Stål, 1875
 Genus Metriophasma Uvarov, 1940
 Genus Oestrophora Redtenbacher, 1906
 Genus Olinta Redtenbacher, 1906
 Genus Periphloea Redtenbacher, 1906
 Genus Perliodes Redtenbacher, 1906
 Genus Planudes Stål, 1875
 Genus Prexaspes Stål, 1875
 Tribe Setosini Zompro, 2004
 Genus Setosa Redtenbacher, 1906
 Tribe Xerosomatini Bradley & Galil, 1977
 Genus Acanthoclonia Stål, 1875
 Genus Apteroxylus Bellanger, Jourdan & Lelong, 2012
 Genus Creoxylus Serville, 1838
 Genus Grylloclonia Zompro, 2004
 Genus Mirophasma Redtenbacher, 1906
 Genus Pachyphloea Redtenbacher, 1906
 Genus Parobrimus Scudder, 1896
 Genus Xera Redtenbacher, 1906
 Genus Xerosoma Serville, 1831
 Genus Xylospinodes Zompro, 2004

References

Phasmid Study Group: Pseudophasmatidae
http://www.phasmatodea.org/genera/anisomorpha.html

Phasmatodea
Phasmatodea families